Théo Berdayes Marques (born 23 May 2002) is a Swiss professional footballer who plays as a forward for Yverdon on loan from FC Sion.

Career
On 26 January 2021, Berdayes signed his first professionally contract with FC Sion until 2025. He made his professional debut with Sion in a 1–0 Swiss Super League win over BSC Young Boys on 7 August 2021.

On 15 June 2022, Berdayes joined Yverdon on loan.

Personal life
Born in Switzerland, Berdayes is of Spanish descent.

References

External links
 
 SFL Profile

2002 births
Swiss people of Spanish descent
Sportspeople from Valais
Living people
Swiss men's footballers
Association football forwards
Switzerland youth international footballers
FC Sion players
Yverdon-Sport FC players
Swiss Promotion League players
Swiss Super League players
Swiss Challenge League players